Southern Air Inc. was a global air cargo carrier headquartered in Florence, Kentucky. It was the first airline to provide ACMI (Aircraft, Crew, Maintenance, Insurance) service for the wide-body Boeing 777F. On November 17, 2021, Southern Air ceased operations as it was merged into Atlas Air.

The airline operated an all-Boeing fleet of aircraft: Boeing 777F, and the Boeing 737-800BCF. Its wide range of services included: long-term ACMI, on-demand commercial charters, as well as Department of Defense Civil Reserve Air Fleet. Southern Air’s operations also supported some of the world’s largest combination carriers as well as government agencies and non-government organizations.

History 
The airline was established on March 5, 1999, by James Neff, out of the assets of Southern Air Transport and started operations in November 1999.

On September 7, 2007, Oak Hill Capital Partners acquired majority ownership of Southern Air and merged Cargo 360 into the airline.

In early 2010, Southern Air took delivery of two Boeing 777 freighters. At the same time, Southern Air introduced new aircraft livery as well as new corporate branding.

In early 2011, Southern Air entered into a multiple year contract with DHL Aviation; by utilizing the Boeing 777, Southern Air was able to augment DHL's overnight express package delivery service through hubs in Cincinnati, Bahrain, Hong Kong and Anchorage, increasing package delivery options provided by DHL to its customers.

The same year Southern Air gradually retired the fleet of Boeing 747-200, 747-300 and 747-400BDSF models.

On 28 September 2012, Southern Air filed for Chapter 11 bankruptcy protection and emerged from bankruptcy in early 2013.

In 2014, Southern Air took delivery of five 737-400SF passenger-to-cargo converted aircraft.

On April 7, 2016, Atlas Air Worldwide Holdings purchased Southern Air for $110 million in an all-cash deal.  The transaction included Worldwide Air Logistics Group, Inc. and its two operating subsidiaries, Southern Air, Inc. and Florida West International Airways, Inc.

On November 17, 2021, Southern Air became fully integrated into Atlas Air through an airline merger, ending a long history of airline operations.

Fleet 
Southern Air operated the following aircraft:

References

External links 

Official website (archived February 23, 2017)

Defunct airlines of the United States
Airlines established in 1947
Airlines disestablished in 2021
Defunct cargo airlines
1947 establishments in the United States
2021 disestablishments in Kentucky
Airlines based in Kentucky
Companies that filed for Chapter 11 bankruptcy in 2012
Transportation in Boone County, Kentucky
Florence, Kentucky
Companies based in Boone County, Kentucky